Jewell is a city in Jewell County, Kansas, United States.  As of the 2020 census, the population of the city was 370.

History
The City of Jewell began in 1870 as a large sod enclosure called Fort Jewell. Named in honor of Lieutenant-Colonel Lewis R. Jewell, Sixth Kansas Cavalry, who died November 30, 1862, of wounds received in the battle of Cane Hill, Ark. November 28, 1862.

The first post office in Jewell was established in July 1870.

Jewel was incorporated as a city in 1880.

Jewell was located on the Missouri Pacific Railroad.

A new community center was built in 1999 across from the city park, it features a Public library, American Legion offices and a 4-room hotel.

Geography
Jewell is located at  (39.670941, -98.152795).

Demographics

2010 census
As of the census of 2010, there were 432 people, 208 households, and 113 families living in the city. The racial makeup of the city was 93.8% White, 1.9% Native American, 0.2% Asian, 0.2% from other races, and 3.9% from two or more races. Hispanic or Latino of any race were 5.6% of the population.

There were 208 households, of which 19.7% had children under the age of 18 living with them, 46.6% were married couples living together, 5.3% had a female householder with no husband present, 2.4% had a male householder with no wife present, and 45.7% were non-families. 42.8% of all households were made up of individuals, and 24.1% had someone living alone who was 65 years of age or older. The average household size was 2.08 and the average family size was 2.88.

The median age in the city was 49.2 years. 21.5% of residents were under the age of 18; 6% were between the ages of 18 and 24; 17.1% were from 25 to 44; 29.9% were from 45 to 64; and 25.7% were 65 years of age or older. The gender makeup of the city was 50.9% male and 49.1% female.

2000 census
As of the census of 2000, there were 483 people, 224 households, and 133 families living in the city. The racial makeup of the city was 99.79% White, and 0.21% from two or more races. Hispanic or Latino of any race were 1.24% of the population.

There were 224 households, out of which 25.0% had children under the age of 18 living with them, 48.7% were married couples living together, 8.0% had a female householder with no husband present, and 40.6% were non-families. 35.3% of all households were made up of individuals, and 21.9% had someone living alone who was 65 years of age or older. The average household size was 2.16 and the average family size was 2.80.

In the city, the population was spread out, with 24.2% under the age of 18, 5.8% from 18 to 24, 22.6% from 25 to 44, 21.1% from 45 to 64, and 26.3% who were 65 years of age or older. The median age was 43 years. For every 100 females, there were 84.4 males. For every 100 females age 18 and over, there were 88.7 males.

The median income for a household in the city was $28,750, and the median income for a family was $34,063. Males had a median income of $28,125 versus $16,528 for females. The per capita income for the city was $15,713. About 13.0% of families and 18.0% of the population were below the poverty line, including 22.5% of those under age 18 and 18.3% of those age 65 or over.

Education
The community is served by Rock Hills USD 107 public school district, which was formed in 2006 by the consolidation of White Rock USD 104 and Mankato USD 278.

Randall and Jewell schools were consolidated into Jewell-Randall schools in the 1960s. Prior to unification,  the Jewell High School mascot was Jewell Wildcats. The Jewell Wildcats won the following Kansas State High School championships: 
 1967 Boys Track & Field - Class BB  
 1968 Boys Track & Field - Class BB 
 1991 Boys Track & Field - Class 1A

References

Further reading

External links
 Jewell - Directory of Public Officials
 Jewell history
 Jewell city map, KDOT

Cities in Kansas
Cities in Jewell County, Kansas
1870 establishments in Kansas
Populated places established in 1870